Douglassia antillensis is a species of sea snail, a marine gastropod mollusc in the family Drilliidae.

Description
The size of an adult shell varies between 10 mm and 13 mm.

Distribution
This species occurs in the demersal zone of the Caribbean Sea, the Gulf of Mexico and the Lesser Antilles.

References

 Fallon P.J. (2016). Taxonomic review of tropical western Atlantic shallow water Drilliidae (Mollusca: Gastropoda: Conoidea) including descriptions of 100 new species. Zootaxa. 4090(1): 1–363

External links
 

antillensis
Gastropods described in 2016